Patrick Bosch (30 October 196411 May 2012) was a Dutch football player.

Club career
Usually played at rightback, Bosch made his professional Eredivisie debut for FC Twente in a March 1985 league match against FC Utrecht. He would go on to play 5 years for Twente before moving to Eerste Divisie club FC Emmen in 1989. He joined amateur side Stevo after leaving Emmen in 1993.

Death
Bosch died from injuries sustained after his car came off the road on his way home and overturned on the 11 May 2012. He was 47 years old.

References

External links
Career stats - Voetbal International 
 Verongelukte Patrick Bosch had Rossumse pastoor als eerste sponsor - Twente Sport 

1964 births
2012 deaths
People from Weerselo
Association football defenders
Dutch footballers
FC Twente players
FC Emmen players
Eredivisie players
Eerste Divisie players
Road incident deaths in the Netherlands
Footballers from Overijssel